Tammari is a language which is spoken in Benin and Togo. It is also known as Ditammari. The Tammari people, who live in Benin and Togo, mostly speak the language. There are about 47.000 speakers. About half live in Togo, the other half in Benin. Ditammari is one of the Gur languages.

There are two versions of the language, Eastern Ditammari and Western Ditammari. Western Ditamari is also called Tamberma or Taberma.

Alphabet

The tones are indicated using the acute accent (high tone) and grave accent (low tone) on the vowel  or the nasal consonant .
The nasalization is indicated with the tilde on the vowels . The accent indicating tone can be combined above these vowels.

See also 
 Tamprusi language
 Mamprusi language
 Kusasi language
 Gourmanché language
 Berba language
 Bariba language
 Mòoré
 Gurene language

References

Oti–Volta languages
Languages of Benin
Languages of Togo